Owasso is a city in Rogers and Tulsa Counties in the U.S. state of Oklahoma, and the largest northern suburb of Tulsa. The population was 38,732 persons as of the 2021 census estimate, compared to 28,915 at the 2010 census, a gain of 32.24 percent. Originally settled in 1881 in Indian Territory, the town was incorporated in 1904 just before Oklahoma statehood and was chartered as a city in 1972.

History
Owasso began as a settlement in 1881, located in the Cooweescoowee District of the Cherokee Nation in Indian Territory, near what is now 66th Street North and North 129th East Avenue. It was called Elm Creek and was named for Elm Creek, a tributary of Bird Creek. The first settler was H.T. (Tole) Richardson. In June 1893, plans began for a rail line to be extended south from Bartlesville to the cattle ranches in the vicinity of Bird Creek. At that time, already several residences, a blacksmith shop, and a general store were in the Elm Creek settlement. Preston Ballard, the owner of the general store, established a post office in the general store on February 10, 1898, and was appointed the first postmaster. The Joseph T. Barnes family moved to the settlement in 1897. Joseph and Luther Barnes bought the blacksmith shop in 1898. The first gas station was opened in 1902 by Donovan Ranta.

The depot was torn down in 1942. Late in 1898, Joseph and Luther Barnes moved their blacksmith shop to the new community. The shop became a temporary home for the Joseph Barnes family. It was the first residence officially moved to the new depot community. In 1898, many of the residents and businesses moved from the Elm Creek settlement to the new community. Preston Ballard moved his post office and general store during that time. The new community became known as Elm Creek since the post office retained its name.

The railroad completed its line in 1899. Its parent company, the Atchison, Topeka & Santa Fe Railway Company, took over the line and property. The first train came into Elm Creek on November 1, 1899. As the land around the end of this railroad developed, the Osage Indian word Owasso, meaning "the end of the trail" or "turn around", was adopted to identify the area because the rail line ended in a turnaround "Y" near the depot. The name of the Elm Creek post office was officially changed to Owasso on January 24, 1900. The rail line was not extended into Tulsa until 1905.

A plat of the original townsite of Owasso, Cherokee Nation, I.T. was signed by the Secretary of the Interior on March 26, 1904, in connection with the town's incorporation. That plat shows three streets running north and south and eight streets running east and west. The north-south streets were named Oklahoma, Kansas, and Missouri, and the east-west streets north of what is now Broadway were named for Union generals, while the east-west streets to the south were named for Confederate generals. These names were later changed; east-west streets are now identified by street numbers, and north-south streets are now named after trees. The original street names were changed to their present names around 1960.

By the time Oklahoma became a state on November 16, 1907, Owasso had a population of 379 within the town limits. The first newspaper was The Owasso Ledger which was first published on August 7, 1903, by U. P. Wardrip. The subscription price was $1.00 per year, paid in advance. The Pioneer Telephone and Telegraph Company was granted a franchise on February 6, 1905, for the town's first telephone exchange. Until the first water tower was erected in 1924, with Spavinaw as the water source, water came into town in barrels from Owasso Lake and sold for $0.50 a barrel.

Owasso was incorporated as a city on September 28, 1972.

Geography
Owasso is a northern suburb of Tulsa, Oklahoma, in the northeastern corner of Oklahoma known as "Green Country" for its vegetation, hills, woods, and lakes, in contrast to the drier Great Plains region of central and western Oklahoma.

Climate

Demographics

As of the census estimate of 2021, 38,732 people, 10,689 households, and 13,477 families are residing in the city. The population density is 2,259.5 people per square mile (5,852.08/km). The racial makeup of the city is 76.6% White, 4.7% Black, 5.8% Native American, 2.5% Asian, 0.1% Pacific Islander, and 8.0% from two or more races. Hispanics or Latinos of any race are 5.4% of the population.

The average household size is 2.81.

In the city, the population is distributed as 37.6% under the age of 18 and 11.1% who are 65 years of age or older.

The median income for a household in the city is $66,897. The per capita income for the city is $30,465. About 6.8% of the population is below the poverty line. Of the city's population over the age of 25, 33.8% hold a bachelor's degree or higher.

Economy
As Tulsa expanded, so did the industry around Owasso, stimulating further growth. Industrial development proceeded through the 1980s and 1990s. Factories included American Airlines, with 9,000 employees, Nordam Group, with 700, Whirlpool, with 1,000 and MCI WorldCom with 2,200.

Owasso is served by the South Kansas and Oklahoma Railroad, which links to Tulsa, the Port of Catoosa, and points north.

Government
Owasso has a council-manager form of government.

Media
Owasso's newspapers, the Owasso Reporter and the Owasso Progress, are both published weekly. Until 2015, the Reporter was owned by Community Publishers, a newspaper and Internet publisher and commercial printer that serves Oklahoma, Missouri, and Arkansas. On Tuesday, April 21, 2015, the Tulsa World announced that its parent company BH Media, a division of Berkshire Hathaway, the Omaha-based investment holding company led by billionaire Warren Buffett, had purchased several suburban newspapers, including the Owasso Reporter.

The Progress is owned by Community Newspaper Holdings.

Notable people
 Tommy Allsup, Rockabilly and Western swing musician, record producer
 Randy Blake, kickboxer
 Jaime Bluma, former MLB pitcher for the Kansas City Royals
 Randy Brogdon, a former member of the Oklahoma Senate and former mayor of Owasso
 Garth Brooks and Trisha Yearwood, country music singers; lived on a ranch east of Owasso for many years.
 Dylan Bundy, pitcher for the Baltimore Orioles, 2011 Gatorade Player of the Year
 Dennis Byrd, defensive end for the New York Jets
 Aaron Colvin, cornerback for the Houston Texans
 Russ Dugger, NASCAR Camping World Truck Series driver
Jo Anna Dossett, member of the Oklahoma Senate
 Brian Flynn, MLB pitcher for the Kansas City Royals
 Stacie L. Hixon, attorney and, judge on the Oklahoma Court of Civil Appeals
 Vic Koenning, professional football linebacker and college coach
 Jon Kolb, an offensive lineman with the Pittsburgh Steelers
 Pete Kozma, MLB shortstop
 Shake Milton, NBA player for the Philadelphia 76ers
 Reese Mishler, actor
 Daryn Pittman, 2013 World of Outlaws sprint car champion
 Paul Smith, quarterback; won Wuerffel Trophy at the University of Tulsa
 Rebel, AEW wrestler/manager and former Impact Wrestling wrestler, Dallas Cowboys Cheerleader, model, actress and cosmetologist

In popular culture
The webcomic Penny Arcade mentions Owasso when one of the two main characters, Tycho Brahe, confesses that he once killed an old woman and buried her there.

The movie The Outsiders has the old Owasso High School (currently the Owasso 7th Grade Center) in the background. Another scene shows downtown Owasso (Main Street) in the background.

Season 1 of the TLC show “90 Day Fiancé” features a couple, Russ and Paola, who is based in Owasso. Paola is Colombian and Russ is from Owasso. Many scenes take place in and around the town while they decide if they can get married within 90 days for Paola to gain citizenship.

See also
 Owasso High School (The Owasso Rams)
Owasso Public Schools

References

External links
 City of Owasso official website

Cities in Rogers County, Oklahoma
Cities in Tulsa County, Oklahoma
Cities in Oklahoma
Tulsa metropolitan area
Populated places established in 1881
1881 establishments in Indian Territory